Darrieussecq is a French surname of Basque origin. Notable people with the surname include:

André Darrieussecq (1947–2020), French rugby union player
Geneviève Darrieussecq (born 1956), French doctor and politician
Marie Darrieussecq (born 1969), French novelist

French-language surnames
Basque-language surnames